El Matador is a third-person shooter developed by Czech studio Plastic Reality Technologies and published by Cenega Publishing.

Gameplay 
The player controls DEA agent Victor Corbet. He fights narkomafia in Colombia. The gameplay is similar to Max Payne. The player can use Bullet time and make shootdodges with aiming. It is also possible to dual-wielding your guns. This game has realistic physics and a destructible environment.

The game also features boss combats, with the bosses being highlighted with a health meter beneath their portrait. They can intake more damage than the average game enemy, and move faster and deal more damage towards the player.

Plot

After a successful raid to rescue DA daughter in a nightclub owned by a drug lord Alberto Entiendez, Victor Corbet is sent to Colombia to assist the local police in taking down La Valedora Cartel, who were involved in a massacre that killed Victor brother. The police department includes captain Carlos Enterrador, ADA Mia Rodriguez, Sgt. Gabriel Montego and Ricardo "Rico" Altemetra, a close friend of Victor.

Victor first assignment consists of eavesdropping a secret meeting of the Cartel in Hotel Paradiso, Bogota, hosted by drug lord nicknamed "El Corsario". During the meeting, Victor team is attacked by the Cartel, with Victor being the only survivor. Victor raids the Hotel on his own, and kills "El Corsario" and several of his men, but the remaining leaders of La Valedora escape by Helicopter.

Due to Victor heroic actions at the hotel, he is nicknamed "El Matador" by his comrades. Rico and Victor are then sent to raid an abandoned factory which serves as a secret drug factory for La Valedora. Victor and Rico are tasked to arrest Guillermo Toro, a drug kingpin who is controlling the operations. During the raid, Victor manages to destroy the factory with C-4, but Toro escapes. Victor and the rest of the team, including Enterrador and Mia, corner Toro in a church. The police raids the church, and in the ensuing shootout Toro is heavily wounded. Victor proceeds to arrest him, but is shot by Enterrador.

The police finds out that La Valedora has a training camp in Colombia ´s jungle. Due to Enterrador distrust of the police force, orders Victor to go on his own to dismantle the training camp, run by a former Israeli agent. Victor raids the camp, killing all hostile forces.

Thanks to information retrieved by Victor, the DEA finds out that the leader of La Valedora is Helmut Köch, a former SS soldier who lives in his island fortress. The DEA, with Victor and Montego leading the team, raids the island. Victor kills Köch in a gunfight.

Documents found in Köch lair reveal that a big drug cargo is being transported in a freighter. Enterrador gathers all police forces to retrieve the cargo, instead of destroying it. Two teams, one led by Rico and Victor, and the other led by Montego, raid the harbor, while Mia serves as air support. During the raid, Rico is shot and killed by an unknown assailant. Victor backfires on him, and unmasks him, turning out to be Montego. Montego reveals to Victor that Carlos pretends to steal the cargo before dying from his wounds.

Victor, with the help of Mia, raids the freighter, where Enterrador and several of his Special Ops men are gathered. He manages to make his way, killing all of his men, and wounds Enterrador. Enterrador justifies all of his actions to Victor, claiming that the justice he served is controlled by men worse than the drug lords he has been fighting. Unbeknownst to Victor, Enterrador plans to shoot him with a gun concealed in his pants. Enterrador takes his gun and points it towards Victor before the screen turns into black and a gunshot is heard.

A mid-credits title card reveals that Mia was promoted after the downfall of the Cartel. Victor seemingly killed Enterrador in the gunfight, and is now working as an international observer in Asia.

Reception 

The game was met with mediocre reviews from critics. It currently holds 54/100 on Metacritic and 57.56% on GameRankings.

References

External links 
Official site
Plastic Reality Site

Third-person shooters
Organized crime video games
Windows games
Windows-only games
Video games about police officers
Video games developed in the Czech Republic
Video games set in Colombia
Video games set in Mexico
2006 video games
Single-player video games
1C Company games